Abdus Sattar Mondal (born 1945) is a Bangladeshi politician who served as Member of Parliament from 1979 to 1984, and from February to March 1996.

Biography
In the 1979 general election Mondal was elected Member of Parliament for constituency Rajshahi-13 on the Bangladesh Nationalist Party (BNP) ticket.

He was the BNP candidate for what, after renumbering, was constituency Rajshahi-4 in the 1991 general election, but finished third behind the Awami League and Bangladesh Muslim League candidates. In the widely boycotted February 1996 general election he was elected as the BNP candidate for constituency Rajshahi-4.

See also
 Politics of Bangladesh

References

Living people
1945 births
Bangladesh Nationalist Party politicians